Alan Raymond Isaac  (born 20 January 1952) is a New Zealand businessman, cricket administrator and former player.

Early life and education
Born in Wellington on 20 January 1952, Isaac was educated at Onslow College and Victoria University of Wellington. He graduated with a Bachelor of Commerce and Administration from Victoria in 1974.

Cricket
A left-handed batsman, Isaac represented Wellington at age-group level, and captained the Wellington second team for three years. However, it has been as a cricket administrator that he has gained prominence. He became president of New Zealand Cricket in 2008, and succeeded Sharad Pawar, former president of the Board of Control for Cricket in India, as president of the International Cricket Council in 2012.

Business career
Isaac had a 35-year career with KPMG in New Zealand. with roles including managing partner, chairman and chief executive officer. He holds directorships with a range of companies, including Skellerup Holdings, Opus International Consultants, and Oceania Healthcare, and is a trustee of the New Zealand Community Trust and the New Zealand Red Cross Foundation.

Honours
In the 2013 New Year Honours, Isaac was appointed a Companion of the New Zealand Order of Merit for services to cricket and business.

In 2015, Isaac received a distinguished alumni award from Victoria University of Wellington.

References

External links
 

1952 births
New Zealand cricketers
New Zealand cricket administrators
People from Wellington City
Living people
Presidents of the International Cricket Council
Companions of the New Zealand Order of Merit
People educated at Onslow College
Victoria University of Wellington alumni
New Zealand accountants
20th-century New Zealand businesspeople
Sportspeople from the Wellington Region